Sohni Mahiwal is a 1946 Indian Hindi-language romantic drama film directed by Ishwarlal and Ravindra Jaykar and produced in Bombay by Jayant Desai Productions. It is based on the folk story of Sohni Mahiwal. The film starred Begum Para in the lead role as Sohni, along with Ishwarlal, Mubarak, Dixit and Shobha.

Cast
 Begum Para as Sohni
 Ishwarlal
 Mubarak
 Dikshit
 Reva Shankar
 Saeed Ahmed
 Gharpure
 Bibibai
 Shobha
 Nafees Begum
 Kesharbai.

Soundtrack 
The music was composed by Lal Mohammad with lyrics by Swami Ramanand and Munshi Dil. The movie is a musical and contains 11 songs, most of which were sung by Zohrabai Ambalewali, who had five solos and three duets with G. M. Durrani. Naseem Akhtar and Reva Shankar sang one song each.

The lyrics for "Nahin Chiraag" and "Oh tujh Pe Salaam Ae Mere Nakeaam-e-Mohabbat" were written by Munshi Dil. The lyrics of the other songs are by Swami Ramanand.

References

External links

1946 films
1940s Hindi-language films
1946 romantic drama films
Indian romantic drama films
Films based on Indian folklore
Indian black-and-white films